Nittorps IK is a Swedish sports club based in Nittorp and active in multiple sports including ice hockey.  The ice hockey team plays in Division 1, the third tier of ice hockey in Sweden, .  They were promoted from Division 2 in 2012 to fill the vacancy left in Division 1F due to the promotion of Karlskrona HK to HockeyAllsvenskan.

Season-by-season (ice hockey)

External links
 Official website
 Ice hockey team profile on Eliteprospects.com

Notes

Ice hockey teams in Sweden
Ice hockey teams in Västra Götaland County